Hafida Gadi (born 14 July 1974) is a French long-distance runner. She competed in the women's marathon at the 2004 Summer Olympics.

References

1974 births
Living people
Athletes (track and field) at the 2004 Summer Olympics
French female long-distance runners
French female marathon runners
Olympic athletes of France
Place of birth missing (living people)